The Matchless G50 is an historic racing British motorcycle made by Associated Motorcycles (AMC) at the former Matchless works in Plumstead, London. Developed in 1958 from the 350 cc AJS 7R, but with the engine capacity increased to 500 cc, 180 G50s were built in the next four years. Although less powerful than its main competitor the Norton Manx the G50 proved highly competitive at three hundred pounds and was faster round bends. If success is measured by longevity then this is the most successful Matchless motorcycle, and high specification replicas are still being produced to this day, although financial problems at AMC ended production in 1963.

The G50 CSR

In 1963, the AMA decided that the G50 should not be allowed to race in the USA as it was not based on a production street bike. Matchless solved the problem by creating a limited-production, street-legal G50 CSR, by fitting the G50 engine into the G80CS Scrambler frame.

The designation "CSR" "In AMC parlance stood for Competition Sprung Roadster"[Bacon Roy, AJS and Matchless postwar twins 1948-1969, page 39, Niton publishing, ], Competition always referring to Scrambles in AMC speak. "This suffix[CSR] was first used in 1958. Earlier, competition[scrambles] models with no rear suspension were simply stamped "C". Later models with rear suspension were given the identification "CS". This was short for "competition sprung". When road versions were introduced,in 1958, the R was added. Hence, CSR means "competition sprung roadster". but they quickly got called the Coffee Shop racer.. It later became known as the Golden Eagle after the name was used in advertising (due to the gold finish of the engine casings).

There were just two colour options - bright blue with a tan seat or bright red and black with a black seat.

Seeley Condor G50
Financial problems at AMC ended production in 1963 and all the tooling and spares were sold to sidecar Grand Prix racer Colin Seeley in 1966. Seeley went on to develop the engine and made his own custom frames to produce a number of G50 'specials' some of which were known as the called the Seeley Condor. These exclusive motorcycles continue to be hand built to this day to individual customer specifications by TGA Ltd, now based in northern France. As well as building motorcycles from new parts, TGA also convert secondhand racing motorcycles for road use.

Seeley G50Mk2
The Seeley G50Mk2 racing motorcycles built by TGA Ltd are high specification with a Titchmarsh chassis, Walmsley G50 motor, 6 speed PGT gearbox and lightweight fairing.

George Beale G50 replicas

Former Isle of Man TT winner George Beale set up George Beale Motorcycles in Coleorton, Leicestershire to make a range of replica motorcycles, including Matchless G50 racing motorcycles to a high specification which includes a special lightweight frame and swing arm, Ceriani forks and a magnesium six speed gear box with lightweight clutch.

See also
List of motorcycles of the 1950s

References

External links
 G50 CSR restoration (French)

G50
Motorcycles introduced in 1958